Ranova pictipes is a species of beetle in the family Cerambycidae. It was described by Thomson in 1864. It is found in Madagascar, and is a light brown colour.

References

Crossotini
Beetles described in 1864